Geremia Bonomelli (1831–1914) was the bishop of the diocese of Cremona in the late years of the 19th century and first years of the 20th century. Bonomelli is still remembered for his work in support of Italian emigrants.

Life

Born in Corte Franca in the time of the Kingdom of Lombardy–Venetia, he was ordained priest for his native diocese of Brescia in 1855. In 1871, Pope Pius IX named him bishop of Cremona.

From 1896 on, he was involved in the pastoral care of Italians that were living abroad, and many missions were founded for Italian emigration. For his work in this area, he was commemorated by Pope Pius XII in Exsul Familia (1952). The pope said that Bonomelli "founded an Agency for the Assistance of Italians who had migrated to other parts of Europe. From this Agency arose many institutions and flourishing centers of civic education and welfare. In 1900, devout priests and eminent laymen attracted to the work founded successful 'missions' in Switzerland, Austria, Germany and France".

Bonomelli was also a strong supporter of the involvement of Catholics (priests and laity) in the care of the poor, and he was involved in first attempts to solve the Roman Question. In 1889, one of his brochures was condemned by the Vatican, and so Bonomelli retracted it. Pope Leo XIII in turn thanked the bishop, saying that he had feared "those who [strove] to wrest [Bonomelli's] writings to support their own views" and insisted that the Pope's "civil princedom is not a question between man and man, but that the liberty of exercising [his] apostolic rights and duties is at stake, and this liberty ought not to be in the power and will of another".

Bonomelli died in 1914.

References

External links
 

1831 births
1914 deaths
Religious leaders from the Province of Brescia
19th-century Italian Roman Catholic bishops
20th-century Italian Roman Catholic bishops
Bishops of Cremona